Brian Fok (born 8 March 1994) is a Nigerian-born Hong Kong footballer who plays as a centre back for Hong Kong First Division club Happy Valley.

Club career
Born in Kaduna, Nigeria to a Nigerian mother and a Hong Kongese father, Brian started to have professional football training in Kaduna Football Academy at the age of 5. In 2004, he moved from Nigeria to Hong Kong. After moving in Hong Kong, Brian trained and played for the youth football team of HKFC Soccer Section, Yau Tsim Mong and Hong Kong Rangers. Brian completed his high school education at Sir Ellis Kadoorie Secondary School (West Kowloon). Brian was also the 200 meter dash champion for 4 years running at the Hong Kong Schools Sports Federation (HKSSF) Athletics Meet.

In 2010, Fok played as an amateur for Rangers in Hong Kong Second Division. In 2011, Brian rejoined Rangers and made his professional debut in February 2012 as a late substitute against Tai Po. On 20 May 2012, Brian started as line-up against Kitchee and played for the whole match which they lost 1–4.

In 2012, Fok studied in England at the Brooke House College Football Academy for 1-year professional football training. In 2013, Brian moved to train and play for Jamie Lawrence Football Academy.

In 2014, Fok went for trial at Chinese Super League club Shanghai Shenhua, going on to sign a three-year deal with the club.

In December 2014, Fok joined Spanish Club CF Cracks on a half season loan, played 6 matches for the club as a centre back and also as a centre forward.

In February 2016, Shanghai Shenhua allowed Brian to join Berceni on a half season loan to gain first team experience.

In August 2016, Fok joined Azerbaijan Premier League club AZAL PFK on a half season loan deal, making his debut as a substitute in a 3–0 defeat to Gabala on 19 September 2016. The appearance meant Fok was the first Hong Kong player to play in Azerbaijan and the 4th Hong Kong player to play in Europe.  On 6 November 2016, Brian started and played full match against Gabala, the match ended at a draw 0:0.  Fok left AZAL on 24 December 2016 following the conclusion of his loan.

On 21 February 2018, Fok joined Uruguayan Segunda División club Juventud on a half season loan.

On 13 August 2018, Fok signed a 2 years deal and transferred to LigaPro club Académico de Viseu.

On 15 July 2019, Fok returned to Hong Kong and signed for Hong Kong Premier League club Kitchee. He played his first game for the club on 10 September 2019 against Lee Man in a Senior Shield match, in which Kitchee was beaten 5-1 and Fok was substituted in the 2nd half.

In October 2020, Fok retired from professional football. However, he came out of retirement in 2021 when he joined newly promoted HKFC for the 2021–22 season of the HKPL.

International career
Since February 2011, Brian has been playing for different age groups of Hong Kong National youth team.

Honours
Kitchee
 Hong Kong Premier League: 2019–20

References

External links
 
 

1994 births
Living people
Sportspeople from Kaduna
Hong Kong footballers
Nigerian footballers
Nigerian people of Hong Kong descent
Hong Kong people of Nigerian descent
Association football defenders
Divisiones Regionales de Fútbol players
Azerbaijan Premier League players
Liga Portugal 2 players
Hong Kong First Division League players
Hong Kong Premier League players
Hong Kong Rangers FC players
AZAL PFK players
Académico de Viseu F.C. players
Kitchee SC players
Hong Kong FC players
Nigerian expatriate footballers
Hong Kong expatriate footballers
Nigerian expatriate sportspeople in Spain
Hong Kong expatriate sportspeople in Spain
Expatriate footballers in Spain
Nigerian expatriate sportspeople in Azerbaijan
Hong Kong expatriate sportspeople in Azerbaijan
Expatriate footballers in Azerbaijan
Hong Kong expatriate sportspeople in Uruguay
Hong Kong expatriate sportspeople in Portugal
Hong Kong expatriate sportspeople in Romania
Nigerian expatriate sportspeople in Portugal
Nigerian expatriate sportspeople in Romania
Nigerian expatriate sportspeople in Uruguay